Nymphaeum or Nymphaion was a town of ancient Cilicia that, according to Pliny the Elder was located between Celenderis and Soli.

Its site is unlocated.

References

Populated places in ancient Cilicia
Former populated places in Turkey
Lost ancient cities and towns